Kinsolving is an American surname. It was first used in the 1770s in Virginia, U.S.. It is derived from Consolver and related to Kingsolver. Notable people with the surname include:

Charles J. Kinsolving III (1904–1984), American Episcopal bishop
George Herbert Kinsolving (1849–1928), American Episcopal bishop
Isabelle Kinsolving (born 1979), American sailor 
Lee Kinsolving (1938–1974), American actor
Lester Kinsolving (1927–2018), American talk radio host
Lucien Lee Kinsolving (1862–1929), American Episcopal bishop
Susan Kinsolving, American poet
Wythe Leigh Kinsolving (1878–1964), American Episcopal priest

See also
Kinsolving Hall, an all-female residence hall of the University of Texas at Austin

References

Americanized surnames